Vítor Manuel da Cruz Godinho (born 27 October 1944) is a former Portuguese footballer who played as forward.

Football career 
Godinho gained 1 cap for Portugal against Cyprus 8 June 1975 in Limassol, in a 2-0 victory.

External links 
 
 

1944 births
Living people
Portuguese footballers
Association football forwards
Primeira Liga players
C.F. Os Belenenses players
Portugal international footballers